Baron Carl Fredrik Lotharius Hochschild (13 September 1831 – 12 December 1898) was a Swedish diplomat. He was the son of Carl Hochschild.

External links
 

1831 births
1898 deaths
Barons of Sweden
Members of the Första kammaren
Swedish Ministers for Foreign Affairs
Ambassadors of Sweden to Italy
Ambassadors of Sweden to the United Kingdom
People from Copenhagen
Knights of the Order of Charles XIII